The Afrikanerbond (Afrikaner League), established in 1994, is the successor to the Afrikaner Broederbond, formerly a South African secret society. Unlike its predecessor, membership is open to anyone over the age of 18 years who identifies with the Afrikaner community. Applicants are required to go through a selection process before membership is granted. The existence of the organisation is no longer cloaked in secrecy; it now has its own website.

The Afrikanerbond acts in the interest of Afrikaners  who are committed to South Africa and want to positively contribute to the creation of a successful South Africa, which provides opportunities for all South Africans. The Afrikanerbond is therefore involved in: 

 the protection and promotion of fundamental rights, 
 protection of constitutional democracy 
 the promotion of responsible citizenship and patriotism. 

The chairmen of the Afrikanerbond were:

See also

 Afrikaner Nationalism
 Afrikaner Calvinism
 Secret society

References

1994 establishments in South Africa
Civic and political organisations of South Africa
Mutual organizations
Civic and political organisations based in Johannesburg
Organizations established in 1994
Afrikaner nationalism